Educating Greater Manchester is the 5th series of the BAFTA award-winning British documentary television programme Educating broadcast on Channel 4. The eight-episode fifth series began broadcast from 31 August 2017. The documentary follows previous installments in the Educating... series including the BAFTA Award-winning Educating Essex (2011), Educating Yorkshire (2013), Educating the East End (2014) and Educating Cardiff (2015). The fifth series was filmed at Harrop Fold School in Little Hulton, Salford.

Episodes

Production
After the fourth series of the Educating... series ended, it was announced that the series would be shelved till 2017 to give the show a break and a rest. It was announced on 18 May 2016 by Channel 4 that the Educating series would be returning in 2017 with a fifth series after a 2-year break. The series will again be filmed using fly on the wall cameras and will film the lives of teachers and students. The fifth series will be filmed in Salford, Greater Manchester. Filming for the fifth series began in September 2016 and finished in August 2017 at the end of the school year, the series premiered on Channel 4 from 31 August 2017.

References

External links
 

2017 British television seasons
2010s British documentary television series
Channel 4 documentary series
English-language television shows
British high school television series
Television shows set in Greater Manchester
Television series about educators
Television series about teenagers